The Linguistic Survey of India (LSI) is a comprehensive survey of the languages of British India, describing 364 languages and dialects. The Survey was first proposed by George Abraham Grierson, a member of the Indian Civil Service and a linguist who attended the Seventh International Oriental Congress held at Vienna in September 1886. He made a proposal of the linguistic survey and it was initially turned down by the Government of India. After persisting and demonstrating that it could be done using the existing network of government officials at a reasonable cost, it was approved in 1891. It was however formally begun only in 1894 and the survey continued for thirty years with the last of the results being published in 1928.

An on-line searchable database of the LSI is available, providing an excerpt for each word as it appeared in Grierson's original publication.  In addition, the British Library has gramophone recordings in its sound archive which document the phonology.

Method and critiques 
Grierson made use of Government officers to collect data from across the British Raj. He made forms and guidance material for the officers who gathered the information. There were numerous problems in ensuring uniformity of data gathering and clarity of understanding. One officer noted the difficulty even of noting the name of the language from a household. Interviewees would name their language after their caste.

The maps and boundaries indicated by Grierson have often been used by political groups seeking reorganizations of state boundaries.

List of volumes 
The list of volumes published by Grierson from 1898 to 1928 are:
 I. Part I   Introduction
Part II Comparative Vocabulary of Indian Languages
 II  Mon–Khmer & Tai Families
 III Part I  Himalayan Dialects, North Assam Groups
Part II Bodo–Naga & Kochin Groups of the Tibeto-Burman Languages
Part III Kuki-Chin & Burma Groups of the Tibeto-Burman Languages
 IV. Munda & Dravidian Languages
 V.  Indo-Aryan Languages, (Eastern Group)
Part I   Bengali-Assamese
Part II  Bihari & Oriya
 VI   Indo-Aryan Languages, Mediate Group (Eastern Hindi)
 VII  Indo-Aryan Languages, Southern Group (Marathi)
 VIII Indo-Aryan Languages, North-Western Group
Part I   Sindhi & Lahnda
Part II  Dardic or Pisacha Languages (including Kashmiri)
 IX. Indo-Aryan Languages, Central Group
Part I   Western Hindi & Panjabi
Part II  Rajasthani & Gujarati
Part III Bhil Languages including Khandesi, Banjari or Labhani, Bahrupia Etc.
Part IV  Pahari Languages & Gujuri
 X.  Eranian Family
 XI. "Gipsy" Languages

Subsequent surveys
A second Linguistic Survey of India project was initiated by the Language Division of Office of the Registrar General & Census Commissioner of India in 1984. This project is ongoing and at the end of year 2010 approximately 40% of the survey has been completed. This survey has a limited objective to trace the changes in the linguistic scenario after Grierson’s study. Several professional linguists have criticized the project for repeating Grierson's methodological mistakes – like choosing local language teachers or government officials as informants rather than laypersons for collecting the linguistic data.

The 1991 census of India found 1,576 "mother tongues" with separate grammatical structures and 1,796 languages classified as "other mother tongues".  Calls for a more complete and exact Linguistic Survey of India soon followed.  It was noted that Grierson's works had relied on untrained field workers and neglected the former province of Burma, Madras and the then princely States of Hyderabad and Mysore.  The result was that South India was under-represented in the LSI.

The Government of India announced an ambitious project to expand and revise the Linguistic Survey of India.  In the Eleventh Five-Year Plan (2007–12) Rs. 2.8 billion was sanctioned for the project. It was classified into two sections: a New Linguistic Survey of India and a Survey of Minor and Endangered Languages.  Under the auspices of the Central Institute of Indian Languages in Mysore, and under the direction of Udaya Narayana Singh, the project was expected to involve over 54 universities, 2,000 investigators and 10,000 linguists and language specialists working over a period of ten years.

An April 2010 article in the online Times of India mentions that the above project has been abandoned but then announces a new initiative following up on the original Grierson survey: the People's Linguistic Survey of India (PLSI) under the auspices of an NGO called the Bhasha Research and Publication Centre, and with Ganesh N. Devy as Chairperson. The project will begin with a survey of Himalayan languages. Rajesh Sachdeva, director of CIIL at the Bhasha Confluence, said the exercise of New Linguistic Survey of India had to be abandoned with “the government developing cold feet”, in the fear that this survey may lead to revival of linguicism or linguistic imperialism.

See also
 Linguistic history of India

Further reading
 George Abraham Grierson, Linguistic Survey of India, 11 Vols. in 19 Parts. Delhi, Low Price Publ. (2005)

References

External links
  Grierson's Linguistic Survey of India - The searchable database
 Gramophone recordings  from the Linguistic Survey of India, containing more than 240 audio files and the corresponding transcriptions. (1913–1929)
 All volumes of the Linguistic Survey of India (1898-1928)

Surveys (human research)
Languages of India
Linguistic history of India
Linguistic research in India